The Nieuport-Delage NiD 640 was a French four-passenger transport monoplane built by Nieuport-Delage.

Development
The NiD 640 was an all-wood high-wing cantilever monoplane powered by a nose-mounted radial engine. An enclosed cockpit for two-crew forward of the wing and a cabin for four passengers was aft. The NiD 640 was powered by  Wright J-5C radial engine and was followed by 12 production aircraft designated NiD 641 powered by a  Lorraine 7M Mizar radial engine. The NiD 640 was converted to an ambulance aircraft and later had a Mizar engine fitted to bring it up to 641 standard. One aircraft was powered by a  Armstrong Siddeley Lynx Major engine and designated the NiD 642 but it did not find a buyer and was scrapped. Seven NiD 641 aircraft were flown by Société des Transports Aériens Rapides (STAR), a subsidiary of Nieport-Delage, on cargo and passenger services from Paris.

Variants
NiD 640
Prototype with a  Wright J-5C radial engine, one built later converted to a 641.
NiD 641
Production aircraft with a  Lorraine 7M Mizar radial engine, 12 built.
NiD 642
Powered by a  Armstrong Siddeley Lynx Major engine, one built.

Operators

Varig

Société des Transports Aériens Rapides

Specifications (NiD 641)

References

Further reading

External links
 STAR and the Nieuport-Delage 641

1920s French civil utility aircraft
 0640
High-wing aircraft
Aircraft first flown in 1927
Single-engined tractor aircraft